Una O'Dwyer may refer to:
Una O'Dwyer (camogie)
Una, Lady O'Dwyer, wife of Michael O'Dwyer, Lieutenant Governor of the Punjab